Teruichi Aono (青野 照市 Aono Teruichi, born January 1, 1953) is a 9-dan professional shogi player from Yaizu, Shizuoka.

Shogi professional

Promotion history
The  promotion history of Aono is as follows:
 4-kyū: 1968
 1-dan: 1970 
 4-dan: April 1, 1974
 5-dan: April 1, 1976
 6-dan: April 1, 1979
 7-dan: April 1, 1980
 8-dan: April 1, 1983
 9-dan: August 5, 1994

Titles and other championships
Aono challenged Makoto Nakahara for the 37th Ōza title in 1989 for his only appearance in a major title match. He has, however, won four non-major shogi championships during his career: the 5th and 10th  titles (1974 and 1979); the 5th  (1978); and the 7th-8th  (198485).

Awards and honors
Aono has received a number of awards for shogi. These include the "Best Winning Percentage" and "Best New Player" awards in 1975, the "Most Consecutive Games Won" award in 1978, and the Kōzō Masuda Award in 1997 and 2017.

In 2011, his efforts in using shogi to promote cultural exchange between Japan and other countries were recognized by the Japanese Ministry of Foreign Affairs and he was awarded the Foreign Minister's Commendation. for Fiscal Year 2011.

Annual Shogi Awards
3rd Annual Awards (April 1975March 1976): Best New Player, Best Winning Percentage
6th Annual Awards (April 1978March 1979): Most Consecutive Games Won
25th Annual Awards (April 1997March 1998): Kōzō Masuda Award
45th Annual Awards (April 2017March 2018): Kōzō Masuda Award

Other awards
1993, February: Japan Foundation 20th Anniversary Commemorative Letter of Appreciation
1998: 25 Years Service Award (Awarded by the JSA in recognition of being an active professional for twenty-five years)
2000: Shogi Honor Fighting-spirit Award (Awarded by JSA in recognition of winning 600 official games as a professional)
2000, December: Shizuoka Prefecture Award
2011, July: Japanese Foreign Minister's Commendation

JSA executive
Aono has been selected multiple times to be a member of the Japan Shogi Association's board of directors throughout his career, and was chosen to be JSA senior managing director in 2013. He served in that capacity until February 2017 when he and two other members of the board were dismissed as part of the JSA's response to the 29th Ryūō challenger controversy.

Shogi promotion efforts
Aono is active in promoting shogi outside Japan including visiting England in 1979 to teach the game to local players, and helping to arrange a visit of twenty Chinese elementary school students from Shanghai to visit an elementary school in Sendagaya, Tokyo in 2015 as part of an international exchange program involving shogi.

9-square shogi
Aono created a new shogi variant ９マス将棋 kyū-masu shōgi "9-square shogi" published in 2016 that is useful for teaching the shogi. It uses a 3x3 board and begins with several different staculturalrt positions in which each player has between 2 and 3 pieces that may or may not be in hand. Promotion is restricted to the last rank on each side. All other shogi rules apply. The game can be thought as a set of tsumeshogi (詰将棋 tsumeshōgi "checkmate") and brinkmate (必死 hisshi) problems.

Bibliography
Aono has written a number of pedagogical materials that have been translated into English including two books and journal articles as well as numerous Japanese-only materials.

References

External links
 ShogiHub: Professional Player Info · Aono, Teruichi

Living people
1953 births
Japanese shogi players
Professional shogi players
Professional shogi players from Shizuoka Prefecture
Recipients of the Kōzō Masuda Award
Shinjin-Ō